Owan is an ethnic group in the Northern part of Edo State, Nigeria. They are one of the Edoid peoples.

Owan is currently made up of two Local Government Areas, namely: Owan East and Owan West, including so many clans; notable amongst them are: Ihievbe, Emai people, Iuleha land, Ora, Igue, Uokha, Otuo, Ikhin, Ivbi-Mion,Ikao, Ivbi-adaobi, Ozalla, etc. Owan was derived from the largest and longest river in the area which is known as Onwan/Owan. Onwanvbua was abbreviated as onwan which means one who makes merry in affluence.

Etymology

The name Owan, also pronounced Onwan, is derived from the root word "Owanbua" which is a name of a notable daughter of Egomi of Uvbiato. Uvbiato is the present day Uhonmora meaning the head of all Ora. Folklores have it that Madam Owan married at Otuo village but was not blessed with any children. When she died, her burial place became a stream that flowed from Otuo, through many villages in Owan before joining the Ule river which eventually emptied into the river "Ose".

Notable people
Aigboje Aig-Imoukhuede, former CEO, Access Bank PLC and current chairman of the Nigerian Stock Exchange
Grace Alele-Williams, first Nigerian woman to receive a doctorate, first female vice chancellor in Nigeria. 
Francis Abiola Irele, professor of African Studies at Harvard University, Provost at Kwara State University.
Olusegun Olutoyin Aganga, former Minister of Trade, Commerce and Investment
Mai Atafo Nigerian fashion tailor
Yisa Braimoh former senator
Michael Imoudu, Labour Leader
Dele Momodu, owner of Ovasion Magazine
DJ Neptune Nigerian producer and disk jockey
Aize Obayan, Professor, former vice chancellor of Covenant University, and current Vice Chancellor of Landmark University
J. D. 'Okhai Ojeikere, photographer
Modupe Ozolua, philanthropist
Mabel Segun, writer and winner of Nigerian Prize for Literature, 2007
Ambruse Vanzekin, Nigerian goal keeper
Waje Nigerian singer, who became famous after being featured on P-Square's 2006 hit track "Do Me"

Tourist destinations

The Giant Footprints of Ikhuse-oke and Ikhuse-osi in Owan-West L.G.A: - Located in a sacred grove between Ukhuse-oke and Ukhuse-osi in lulehe clan of Owan west local government area, very distinct footprints of a prehistoric giant are permanently embedded on the flat granite rocks. Some believe the footprints were made when the world was still in its molten state.
Ihievbe Waterfalls, located in Ihievbe, Owan-East L.G.A: Here, water gushes out hot at one point and ice cold at another. The natives claim that the water is medicinal.
The lapping rocks of Igwe-sale in Owan-East L.G.A.
Akatamiyan Shrine in Ihievbe, Owan-East.
The Animal Footprints of Ivbiodohen - Footprints of various species of animals are embedded on a flat granite stab that confound all imaginations. Legend has it that the footprints were imprinted during the formative stages of the planet earth. The footprints are very detailed and like the ones in Ukhuse Oke, will require an extensive archaeological research. Ivbiodohen is in luleha clan of Owan west Local Government area north of Edo state.
The Great Hills of Urhoe in Owan-East L.G.A.
Arhe Spring in Uzebba, Owan West L.G.A.: Folklore has it that this spring gives water to Uzebba. It is believed that the goddess of this spring is blessed with long breasts, and that she blesses the area with fertility.
In Avbiosi (Owan West) there is Agbede Abohi.

The whistling tortoise in Avbiosi 
The Okhaku'roros so perfected the art of wars to a stage that they used magical means to make tortoises into signaling devices. These tortoises would whistle to indicate imminent attacks. An Akhuere or ducant tree was planted on a spot in Avbiosi to mark the fetish object, which they named Unuo gboeren. To avoid spiritual repercussions, hunters would not pick the whistling tortoise in that vicinity. The Unuo gboeren is a shrine that still stands today in Avbiosi. In 1976 the Unuo gboeren tree was to give way to a new road, being constructed by Niger cat construction company. The road was supposed to be a thoroughfare passing through Avbiosi to Ifon in Ondo state, Nigeria. The intervention of Pa Alfred Onime Obuhoro spared this tree and the road was diverted from the shrine. Pa Obuhoro was born under the tree on the 24th of December 1922. This shrine is appeased during severe draughts to bring rain.

References

Ethnic groups in Nigeria